Statistics of the USFSA Football Championship in the 1907 season.

Tournament

First round
 Burdigala Bordeaux - US Cognaçaise
 Olympique de Cette 0-5 Stade Olympique des Étudiants Toulousains  
CPN Châlons 5-0 Groupe Sportif Nancéien 
 Olympique de Marseille 9-1 Sporting Club de Draguignan

Second round 
CPN Châlons 1-0 Sporting Club Abbeville 
 Stade Olympique des Étudiants Toulousains 7-1 Burdigala Bordeaux
 Olympique de Marseille 8-1 Lyon Olympique

Quarterfinals 
RC Roubaix 7-0 CPN Châlons
Le Havre AC - US Le Mans (Le Mans forfeited)
RC France 5-0 Union sportive Servannaise
Olympique de Marseille 1-0 Stade Olympique des Étudiants Toulousains

Semifinals  
RC France 3-1Olympique de Marseille
RC Roubaix 1-1 Le Havre AC (match replayed)
RC Roubaix 7-1 Le Havre AC

Finale 
RC France 3-2 RC Roubaix

References
RSSF

USFSA Football Championship
1
France